The 1930 North Carolina Tar Heels football team was an American football team that represented the University of North Carolina as a member of the Southern Conference during the 1930 college football season. In their fifth season under head coach Chuck Collins, North Carolina compiled an 5–3–2 record.

Schedule

References

North Carolina
North Carolina Tar Heels football seasons
North Carolina Tar Heels football